Yelovo is a rural locality (a selo) and the administrative center of Yelovsky District of Perm Krai, Russia, located on the banks of the Votkinsk Reservoir. Population:

References

Rural localities in Yelovsky District